Linda Morrison Combs (born 1946) is  a former U.S. federal government official. She was the Controller of the Office of Management and Budget in the Executive Office of the President at the White House. She had five Presidential Appointments confirmed by the United States Senate and served under three Presidents: Presidents Ronald Reagan, George H. W. Bush, and George W. Bush.

In 2014, North Carolina Gov. Pat McCrory appointed her State Controller on an interim basis. He subsequently nominated Combs to continue in the position. She was later confirmed by the North Carolina General Assembly and took the oath of office on May 27, 2016.

OMB Service
President George W. Bush nominated her on February 28, 2005 to be the Controller of OMB.  The United States Senate unanimously confirmed Combs on June 24, 2005.

As Controller, Combs oversaw all of Federal financial management, was the head of the Office of Federal Financial Management, and chaired the U.S. Chief Financial Officers Council. She owned three initiatives of the President's Management Agenda: improving financial performance, eliminating improper payments, and real property.

Also, Combs oversaw Government-wide financial management policies, and requirements.  Specifically she focused on financial results in the largest 24 departments and agencies in the United States Federal Government.  She oversaw about $2.47 trillion in spending each year.       
   
Notably, during Combs's tenure at OMB, the Federal CFO community:

1) For the first time in history and for the second straight year successfully accelerated financial reporting so that audited financial statements were published by ever major agency within 45 days of the close of the fiscal year (a pace that significantly bettered private sector reporting and improved on past Government results when agencies had taken as long as 5 months to report);

2) Obtained clean audit opinions in 19 of the 24 largest agencies for two straight years, and decreased the number of material weaknesses by more than 15% despite tougher audit standards (compared to achieving only one clean audit in 1990 and only six in 1996 for those same 24 agencies);

3) Eliminated approximately $9 billion in improper payments — a 17% decrease from 2004.

4) Developed and reported the first ever government-wide inventory of the Federal real property assets, reporting data on more than 1.2 million assets worldwide, and disposing of $3.5 billion in excess property from 2004.

Early life and education
A native of Granite Falls, North Carolina, Combs earned an Associate of the Arts degree at Gardner-Webb University, Bachelor of Science and Master's degrees from Appalachian State University, and a Doctorate in Educational Administration from Virginia Polytechnic Institute and State University. She is also a graduate of the Program for Senior Managers in Government at Harvard University, and holds an honorary Doctorate from Gardner-Webb University.

Government service and private sector career

Combs was previously appointed by President George W. Bush and confirmed by the United States Senate to the position of Assistant Secretary for Budget and Programs and Chief Financial Officer at the U.S. Department of Transportation (DOT).  As Assistant Secretary, Combs oversaw all budgetary and management functions of the Department, including budget development and budget execution. As Chief Financial Officer, she was responsible for oversight of the Department’s $57 billion appropriation, the Government Performance and Results Act, as well as general monitoring of programs.

Prior to her appointment at DOT, Combs held a Presidential Appointment, confirmed by the Senate, at the United States Environmental Protection Agency, where she served as Chief Financial Officer from 2001–2003.

During the previous Reagan and Bush Administrations, Combs served in various oversight roles and executive level management positions at the U.S. Department of Education, U.S. Department of Veterans Affairs, and U.S. Department of the Treasury.

Prior to government service, and following a successful career of over ten years in instructional and administrative positions in the Winston-Salem/Forsyth County School System, she was elected in 1980 to the Board of Education in Winston-Salem/Forsyth County, North Carolina. In 1986 she was appointed as Education Advisor to the Governor of North Carolina, James G. Martin.

Combs has also spent a number of years in the private sector. In her role of Operations Officer and Manager of National Direct Student Loans for Wachovia Corporation, Combs was responsible for the general management of National Direct Student Loan Operations, with an expense budget that affected several million dollars of annual revenue. For ten years, Combs and her husband founded and built their own highly successful private record label and music catalog company to achieve worldwide distribution of CDs, videos, and music books. She is also a published author on family caregiving, and was a national spokesperson for Warner Lambert Pharmaceutical Company.

Before returning to the federal government in 2001, Combs was a member of the Board of Visitors of the Babcock Graduate School of Management at Wake Forest University, Chair of the Board of Directors of the Appalachian State University Foundation, and a member of the Board of Trustees at Gardner-Webb University. She also served on several corporate boards.

Bibliography

Awards and honors

Timeline
1968–1979: Teacher, Coach, Reading Coordinator, Assistant Principal, Workshop Leader Winston-Salem/Forsyth County School System (Winston-Salem, NC)
1979–1982: Operations Officer and Manager, Wachovia Corporation (Winston-Salem, NC)
1982 - 1984: The Executive Secretary, U.S. Department of Education (Washington, DC)
1984 - 1986: Deputy Under Secretary for Management, U.S. Department of Education (Washington, DC)
1986 - 1987: Education Advisor to the Governor of North Carolina (Raleigh, North Carolina)
1987 - 1989: Acting Associate Administrator for Management, U.S. Department of Veterans Affairs (Washington, DC)
1989 - 1991: Assistant Secretary for Management and Chief Financial Officer, US Department of the Treasury (Washington, DC)
1991 - 2001: Caregiver, Author, Consultant, Spokesperson, Entrepreneur (Winston-Salem, NC)
2001 - 2003: Chief Financial Officer, United States Environmental Protection Agency (Washington, DC)
2003 - 2005: Assistant Secretary for Budget and Programs and Chief Financial Officer, United States Department of Transportation (Washington, DC)
2005 - 2007: Controller, Office of Management and Budget, Executive Office of the President (Washington, DC)
2014–present: Controller, State of North Carolina (Raleigh, NC)

References

External links

1946 births
Living people
Harvard University alumni
United States presidential advisors
North Carolina Republicans
Gardner–Webb University alumni
Appalachian State University alumni
Virginia Tech alumni
Women in North Carolina politics
Women chief financial officers
American chief financial officers
People from Lenoir, North Carolina
People from Granite Falls, North Carolina
Writers from Winston-Salem, North Carolina
21st-century American women